Hostětín is a municipality and village in Uherské Hradiště District in the Zlín Region of the Czech Republic. It has about 200 inhabitants.

History
The first written mention of Hostětín is from 1412. In 1516, Hostětín was referred to as an abandoned village, but in 1576 it was repopulated. Between 1964 and 1990, Hostětín was an administrative part of Pitín.

Sustainability

The village is known for its environmental activities. Since 1995, the village and other organizations have realized several projects, among them apple juice factory, passive house and solar panels. Because of this, on 22 March 2010 Charles, Prince of Wales has visited this village. In 2015 there was a visit of Andrew Schapiro, ambassador to the Czech Republic of United States during Earth Day.

The municipality has already won several awards for its approach to the use of renewable energy sources, such as the Energy Globe 2007 or the Czech Solar Award 2009. In 2012, Hostětín, along with 19 other European municipalities and regions, won the Climate Star International Award 2012.

References

Villages in Uherské Hradiště District